Jirdeh-e Pasikhan (also Romanized as Jīrdeh-e Pasīkhān; also known as Pasīkhān) is a village in Molla Sara Rural District, in the Central District of Shaft County, Gilan Province, Iran. At the 2006 census, its population was 664, in 176 families.

References 

Populated places in Shaft County